The Cospudener See (sometimes translated as Lake Cospuden) is an artificially constructed lake situated directly on the southern outskirts of Leipzig, Germany. Leipzig, Markkleeberg and Zwenkau have shares in the lake which is on the site of a former open cast mine. The lake is popularly known as "Cossi", more rarely "Cospi", and has become highly popular with the local population, with long stretches of sand beaches (some clothing-optional, following the East German tradition of public nude bathing) and with a sauna directly located at the lake.  There is also a small sailing harbor. The lake is a part of the Central German Lake District.

Etymology of the name Cospuden 
The name comes from the owner of the seigneurial domain (Rittergut) located there: Heinricus de Kozebude around 1216. The name then evolved from Kozbude (1240), Kossebude (1350), Kossebode (1378), Kostworde (1564) to Kospuden in 1875. Otto von Dieskau built a paper mill here in 1599. It became a hamlet to which Johann Sebastian Bach refers in his Peasant Cantata written in 1740. Cospuden is then attached to the municipality of Gautzsch in 1875 which is in turn attached to Markkleeberg 1934. The population was 54 in 1871.

Origin of the lake 
The opening of the Cospuden opencast mine (1981) as a branch from the Zwenkau opencast mine coincided with the radical coal mining policy that had been in operation in the GDR since the mid-1970s, in which the aim was to maximize the use of domestic lignite as a result of the oil crisis. The opencast mine was to be operated in several fields with an annual output of approx. 5-6 million tons until around 1996. The excavation of the floodplain landscape of the White Elster, which is used for agriculture and forestry, destroyed a hitherto popular local recreation area south of Leipzig. In addition, several small settlements, such as the former manor Lauer, were devastated and resettled a total of 43 residents. The eponymous village of Cospuden (38 inhabitants), whose inhabitants had already been resettled in 1974 in connection with the Zwenkau opencast mine, was finally dredged over in the course of 1981. The economic structural change and massive acceptance problems in the population resulted in the establishment of the broad citizen initiative Stop Cospuden in 1989. This led to the suspension of production in 1992.

Due to the location on the immediate outskirts of Leipzig, the GDR's re-use plan already provided for the remaining hole to be completely filled with water after the end of production and for the creation of leisure-oriented re-use options. This core idea was retained in the revitalization of the site.

This made the Cospudener See the first mining lake in the Neuseenland of Leipzig that could be handed over to subsequent use. The advantage in terms of time compared to the other lakes and the location close to the city and with good transport connections caused the comparatively rapid establishment of the demanding leisure facilities in the vicinity of the lake. In terms of scope, these extend far beyond the legally prescribed revitalization services and also beyond the forms of use at comparable residual lakes, since the Cospudener See was viewed as a model project for the possibilities of designing a post-mining landscape. The financing and implementation of the plans was essentially due to the subject of Expo 2000's motto "man - nature - technology", in which the Cospudener See took part as a decentralized contribution of the city of Leipzig. It was the focus of the contribution "landscape use - landscape care". The Expo was the occasion and motor for the revitalization of the Cospuden opencast mine site.

Usage

Overview 
During the revegetation, a local recreation area with a beach and landscape park was laid out around the lake and opened as part of Expo 2000 on 1 June 2000. The leisure activities are for sunbathing and swimming and are well accepted by sailors, windsurfers, kite surfers, inline skaters, divers and cyclists, so that the Cospudener See has developed into a popular local recreation area. In recent years, it has been frequented by an average of around 450,000 people per season. In the course of the Leipzig Olympic application for 2012, competitions were held at Lake Cospuden. Rowing, triathlon and beach volleyball and a wide range of other leisure activities are planned. The lake offers the following uses:

North Shore Landscape Park 

 Entrance building with an exhibition on the history of mining and the change in landscape in the south of Leipzig and with a bicycle rental station,
  long landscape and experience axis from the entrance building to the beach area,
 Tertiary forest (arboretum) consisting of plant communities and geological artefacts reminiscent of the time when lignite was formed
 water playground,
 Beach pavilions with service stations (catering, changing rooms, sanitary facilities), pier for boat trips,
 event stage,
 miniature golf course.

Since 2010, the Th!nk? Festival for Techno and House music is held every year on the last Sunday of July.

Zöbigker Winkel (East Bank) 

 Water sports center Pier I (paddling, rowing, surfing, sailing, kite surfing, diving school, boat rental etc.)
  long marina with three piers and berths for about 200 boats, pier for boat trips,
 three large harbor houses with service stations, gastronomy with lake terrace, retail trade, sauna with lake access, sanitary facilities, holiday apartments,
 gastronomic establishment at the Ostuferweg with restaurant, beach café and beach bar
 nine-hole golf course
 dive trail with natural and artificial underwater attractions (e.g. underwater forest, boat wreck, parking meter, conveyor belts).

Bistumshöhe (South Bank) 

 Observation tower (180 steps) on an artificial hill ( above sea level), view over the lake, the Belantis amusement park and the towers of Leipzig
 Herds of wood bison and sika deer graze in an enclosure on the shore.

West Bank  
 Priority and reservation area for nature and landscape protection
 Minimum ecological network between the landscape protection areas of Leipzig Riverside Forest in the north and the White Elster floodplain (Elsteraue) in the south.

Miscellaneous  
 an island mailbox,
 two islands with shipwreck,
  long circular trail (completely paved bike and skater trail) around the lake with connecting trails, e.g. to Markkleeberg, Belantis, Kulkwitzer See, the Leipzig boroughs of Grünau, Großzschocher and Schleußig, to the southern floodplain forest and to the agra park in Markkleeberg 
 Boat tours with the MS Cospuden and the solar boat Solaria 1
 Two covered self-drive rafts with BBQ,
 Covered pedal cars equipped with transparent rain tarpaulins for families and especially people with walking difficulties, which are offered for rent
 Diverse events (outdoor cinema, dragon boat races, long-distance swimming, concerts by the lake, readings, recitals, changing exhibitions, etc.)

Watercourses 

A newly created canal connects the northern part of the lake navigable (small boats) via the Waldsee Lauer (Forest lake Lauer) and via the Batschke (today mostly a raft ditch) through the forests of the Elster-Pleiße-Floodplain with the Pleiße and also via the lock at the Connewitz weir with the White Elster. The Zwenkauer See is also to be connected to the Cospudener See via the Neue Harth canal, which, according to press reports, is "stuck in planning and financing issues" in 2022. Both projects are considered the first steps towards the implementation of a water network between the lakes in the Leipzig Neuseenland.

As part of this network, a large part of the flooded opencast mines are to be connected to each other and to the city of Leipzig via the watercourse. This artificially connected lake district, which can be used for water tourism, would have better development and marketing opportunities than a series of unconnected individual lakes due to the synergy effects resulting from the linking of urban landscape, alluvial forests and open-cast mining lakes. Due to the high investments, which are estimated at 30-35 million euros, the participation of private investors and the finding of reliable sponsorship and operator models for the implementation of the plans will be decisive for success. The Cospudener See is part of the 2015 submitted Tourismuswirtschaftlichen Gesamtkonzeptes für die Gewässerlandschaft im mitteldeutschen Raum, which means in English Overall Tourism Concept for the Water landscape in Central Germany.

Specifics  
It is possible to marry on the ship The MS Neuseenland, a Hamburg harbor barge, has been operating as a charter ship on the lake since 2003.

Traffic  
In addition, Leipzig bus line 65 runs from there directly to the north beach, which connects the Leipzig borough Großzschocher in the northwest and the Markkleeberg S-Bahn station in the southeast. Cospudener See is part of the tarif zone 110 (City of Leipzig) from the direction of Großzschocher. In the summer months, from May to September, this area can also be reached on weekends with the extended Leipzig bus line 79 (Thekla-Stötteritz-Probstheida-Cospudener See).

The lake is also connected to the Leipzig river and canal network by a lock in the northern area. This makes it possible to drive from the city harbor in Leipzig to the lake. Not only smaller sailing ships can dock in the harbor, but there is also a pleasure boat from Pier I. The ship MS Cospuden operated by Tourismus- und Freizeitservice GmbH has been sailing on the lake since 25 March 2000. It has an upper and a lower deck. A trip with a lecture including the sailors' superstitions takes about an hour.

Gallery

Honours 
In 2003, the project Leipzig. A Second Nature Landscape Cospuden was on the shortlist of the European Union Prize for Contemporary Architecture - Mies van der Rohe Award.

See also 
 Central German Lake District

Literature
 Christliches Umweltseminar Rötha e. V. (Ed.): Den Wandel zeigen – den Wandel erleben: Cospuden. Südraum Journal Bd. 12. Leipzig 2000/2001
 Lausitzer und Mitteldeutsche Bergbauverwaltungsgesellschaft (Ed.): Schaffung von Tagebaurestseen im mitteldeutschen Bergbaurevier. Berlin 1999
 Lutz Schiffer et al. (Ed.): Bergbaurestseen in Mitteldeutschland. Seenkompass. Chemnitz/Espenhain 2002
 Mudroch / Stottmeister / Kennedy / Klapper (Eds.), Remediation of Abandoned Surface Coal Mining Sites, Springer Verlag Berlin / Heidelberg / New York 2002, ISBN 978-3-642-0741-1
 Lothar Eißmann, Armin Rudolph: Metamorphose einer Landschaft – Die aufgehenden Seen um Markkleeberg Sax, 2002, ISBN 3-934544-27-4
 Horst Riedel, Stadtlexikon Leipzig von A bis Z, Pro Leipzig Verlag, Leipzig 2005, ISBN 3-936508-03-8, p. 96
 Andreas Berkner, Grüne Wende. Leipzig im Zentrum der "Neuen Wasserlandschaft Mitteldeutschlands, in: Der Leipzig Atlas ed. by Helga Schmidt / Gudrun Mayer / Dorothea Wiktorin, Herman-Josef Emons Verlag, 2005, ISBN 3-89705-269-5, pp. 142–143
 Angela Zabojnik, Grüne Wende. Wassertouristische Traditionen und Visionen, in: Der Leipzig Atlas ed. by Helga Schmidt / Gudrun Mayer / Dorothea Wiktorin, Herman-Josef Emons Verlag, 2005, ISBN 3-89705-269-5, pp. 144–145
 Rebecca Heinze, Cospudener See. Windjammer und Surfmanöver vor Leipzigs Toren, in: Leipziger Blätter Sonderheft Mitteldeutsche Seenlandschaft, Leipzig 2007, ISBN 978-3-938543-35-1, pp. 24–28
 Geschichte der Stadt Leipzig, Band 4, Vom Ersten Weltkrieg bis zur Gegenwart, ed. by Ulrich von Hehl, Leipziger Universitätsverlag, Leipzig 2019, ISBN 978-3-86583-804-9, pp. 882f., 901–903, 944

References

External links 
 
 Cospudener See website (English)
 Lake Cospuden on www.leipzig.travel (English)
 

Lakes of Saxony
Mining in Saxony
Geography of Leipzig
Tourist attractions in Leipzig
Markkleeberg
LCospudener See